John Law (born 1877) was a Scottish professional footballer who played as a winger for Sunderland. His clubs in his homeland included Abercorn.

References

1887 births
Footballers from Dumfries
Scottish footballers
Association football wingers
Sunderland A.F.C. players
Rangers F.C. players
Lincoln City F.C. players
King's Own Scottish Borderers F.C. players
Gainsborough Trinity F.C. players
Leith Athletic F.C. players
Carlisle United F.C. players
Kilmarnock F.C. players
Falkirk F.C. players
Abercorn F.C. players
Queen of the South F.C. players
English Football League players
Scottish Football League players
Year of death missing